This is a list of  protected areas in Peru.

Natural heritage

The Constitution of Peru of 1993 recognized the natural resources and ecosystem variety of its country as a heritage. In 1990, the National System of Natural Areas that are protected by the Government (SINANPE) was created. This entity depends on the National Service of Protected Areas by the State (SERNANP), Ministry of Environment.

Peru has 75 natural protected areas (15.21% of the country surface area) that are preserved by the National Government: 12 national parks, 9 national sanctuaries, 4 historical sanctuaries, 15 national reserves, 3 wildlife refuges, 2 landscape reserves, 8 communal reserves, 6 protected forests, 2 hunting enclosed lands and 14 reserved zones. A map was also created containing the natural protected areas.

Peru is considered to be among 17 of the most megadiverse countries in the world. With over 1,700 species of birds, it has the world's second most diverse avian community, after Colombia.

National Parks are places where the wild flora and fauna are protected and preserved. Natural resources exploitation and human settlements are forbidden.

National System of Natural State Protected Areas

National parks
 Cutervo, created in 1961 and located in Cajamarca, is the oldest Peruvian National Park. It contains many caves, including the San Andres Cave is a home of the endangered guacharo (oilbird) and golden quetzal.
 Tingo Maria is located in Huanuco Region. Its principal attraction is the Cueva de las Lechuzas (Owl Cave), another guacharo habitat.
 Manu, located in the Regions of Madre de Dios and Cuzco. In 1977, UNESCO recognised it as a Reserve of Biosphere; and in 1987, it was pronounced a Natural Heritage of Humanity.
 Huascarán is located in Ancash. It was also pronounced a Natural Heritage of Humanity and recognized as Reserve of Biosphere. Peru's highest snow-covered mountain (6,768 m) is found here, also named Huascarán. This park is the habitat of the Puya raimondii, the cougar, the jaguar, the llama, the guanaco, the marsh deer, the Peruvian tapir, the Peruvian piedtail, a hummingbird species, and many kinds of ducks.
 Cerros de Amotape (Amotape Hills) is located in Piura and Tumbes. It has many dry-climate forests and endangered species such as the American crocodile.
 The Abiseo River Park, another Natural and Cultural Heritage of Humanity site, is located in San Martín.
 Yanachaga–Chemillén, a tropical forest preservation zone at 4,800 m, is located in Pasco Region. The Palcazu River, Huancabamba River, Pozuzo River and their affluents flows through the park. Some native communities still live in here. There are also archaeological fields from the Inca and Yanesha cultures.
 Bahuaja-Sonene is located in Madre de Dios. It contains Puno Region's tropical forests, the Heath Pampas and part of the Tambopata National Reserve.
 Cordillera Azul
 Otishi
 Alto Purús
 Ichigkat muja – Cordillera del Condor
 Güeppí Sekime
 Sierra del Divisor, created in 2015, is located in Loreto and Ucayali at the border with Brazil.
 Yaguas, created in 2018, is a tropical forest protection zone along the Yaguas river located in Loreto near the border with Colombia.

National reserves

 Pampa Galeras – Barbara D'Achille is located in Ayacucho. It is the habitat of the vicuña.
 Junin is located in Junín. One of its main purposes is to protect the ecosystem and biodiversity of Lake Junín.
 Paracas is located in Ica. Its main purpose is to preserve the sea ecosystem and protect the historical and cultural heritage of the area.
 Lachay is located in Lima. Its main purpose is to restore and protect the ecosystem of the Lomas de Lachay (Lachay Hills).
 Titicaca is located in Puno. Its main purpose is to preserve Lake Titicaca's ecosystems and landscape.
 Salinas and Aguada Blanca are located in Arequipa and Moquegua. Their main purpose is to preserve flora, fauna and landscape.
 Calipuy is located in La Libertad.  Its main purpose is to protect guanaco populations.
 Pacaya-Samiria is located in Loreto. Its main purpose is to preserve the ecosystems of the Omagua Region and to promote the indigenous towns.
 Tambopata
 Allpahuayo-Mishana
 Tumbes
 Matsés National Reserve
 System of Islands, Islets and Guano Sites National Reserve
 Pucacuro
 San Fernando National Reserve

National sanctuaries
National sanctuaries are areas of national importance for the protection of the habitat of specific species of flora and fauna, and natural formations of scientific or scenic interest.
 Huayllay
 Calipuy
 Mejía Lagoons
 Ampay
 Manglares de Tumbes ("Mangroves of Tumbes")
 Megantoni
 Pampa Hermosa
 Tabacones Namballe
 Cordillera de Colán

Historical sanctuaries

 Chacramarca
 Pampas de Ayacucho ("Pampas of Ayacucho")
 Machu Picchu
 Pómac Forest

Wildlife refuges
 Laquipampa
 Pantanos de Villa
 Udima Cloud Forests Wildlife Refuge

Landscape reserves
 Nor Yauyos-Cochas
 Cotahuasi Subbasin
 Qhapiya Landscape Reserve

Communal reserves
Communal reserves are conservation areas for flora and fauna, allowing traditional use for the rural populations surrounding the areas. The use and marketing of the natural resources within the communal reserve is conducted by the same rural populations.

Protected forests
 Aledaño Bocatoma del Canal Nuevo Imperial ("Adjacent to the Nuevo Imperial Canal Intake")
 Puquio Santa Rosa ("Santa Rosa (Water) Spring")
 Pui–Pui
 San Matías–San Carlos
 Pagaibamba
 Alto Mayo

Enclosed hunting lands
 El Angolo
 Sunchubamba

Reserved zones

 Chancaybaños
 Güeppí
 Santiago-Comaina
 Waywash mountain range
 Sierra del Divisor Reserved Zone
 Humedales de Puerto Viejo Reserved Zone
 Nieva River Reserved Zone
 Lomas de Ancón Reserved Zone
 Bosque de Zárate Reserved Zone
 Illescas Reserved Zone
 Yaguas Reserved Zone
 Ancón Reserved Zone
 Huacachina Reserved Zone

National forests 
Biabo Cordillera Azul
Mariscal Cáceres
Pastaza–Morona–Marañon	
Alexander von Humboldt

Areas of regional conservation 
 Chuqik'iraw
 Tamshiyacu Tahuayo
 Titankayuq
 Waytapallana

See also
Iperu, tourist information and assistance
Tourism in Peru

References

External links 
  SERNANP Official Website

Peru
Peru
National parks
 
Protected areas